Great Harbour Cay  is the major island in the north Berry Islands. It has a population of 353 (2010 census).

The islands are a stirrup-shaped chain of thirty large cays and numerous small cays of about thirty-two miles in length. The islands are located to the south of Great Abaco and about forty miles north-northwest of Nassau.

Berry Island Chain

The Berry Islands' chain has seven miles (11  km) of oceanfront beaches that include isolated enclaves, caverns, and open expanses. Haines Cay has  of beaches.

The island was substantially damaged by Hurricane Andrew in 1992 but has fully recovered since. The hurricane made landfall twice while moving through the Bahamas, crossing Eleuthera with 160 mph (260 km/h) winds and passing through the Berry Islands with sustained winds of 150 mph (240 km/h).

Development
Great Harbour Cay underwent a period of intense and successful development in the late 1960s when famous persons such as Cary Grant, Douglas Fairbanks, Brigitte Bardot and the Rat Pack vacationed there along with Telly Savalas who had his own landing pad (Kojak) for his helicopter. F. Lee Bailey frequented with his helicopter and spent early morning at the beach hut enjoying a cup of coffee. Francis Shields was rumored to live on the island though never seen even after development slowed and then stopped in the late 1970s. Attempts were made in the late 1970s into the early 1980s to revitalize Great Harbour Cay; but these were overshadowed by drug and weapons traffic in 1983, resident 79-85 source (Book: Drugs, Law Enforcement And Foreign Policy - Report by the Committee on Foreign Relations, US Senate), and the island has been quiet since. The recently elected Bahamian government has made an effort to revive the tourism industry, especially on the outer islands, and great progress and interest has been rekindled in the smaller islands.
Combined with the 9-hole golf course designed by Joe Lee and constructed by Golf Force, the full-service marina, and other island attractions of fishing and diving, the island looks set for a surge in development.

Certain actions in recent years, including repaving of the airport and all major roads, have led to increased interest in the island. The planned renovation of the water supply has not occurred, but has not had a major impact due to the large aquifer under the island and the widespread use of wells. There is only a small hotel on the island, catering principally to Bahamians, meaning lodging for tourists is limited to rental townhouses and single-family homes. There has been a rumor of a new hotel yet to be confirmed.

Sugar Beach Hotel
Sugar Beach Hotel, a frequent haunt of the rich and famous, is now deserted. In the late 1970s, the Sugar Beach Hotel was operational as an entertainment facility for cruise ships. Dinghies would bring passengers ashore to listen to a band and dance.

Bullock's Harbour
Access from Great Harbour Cay to Bullocks Harbour was over a manual crank bridge: Bullocks Harbour and Great Harbour are separated by an ocean inlet and tall cliffs. In the late 1970s, there was one building that served as a health facility, post office, and operator-assisted telephone. Across the street, there was an old home converted into a schoolhouse. There was one grocery store with live chickens and two bars known as the Chicken Coop and The Grave Yard. Resident 79-85 source.

Shark Creek
Shark Creek, the southernmost point of the island, is a popular shark fishing spot. A great hammerhead was reputedly caught off the coast near Ag point. The shark has not been seen nor reported since being tagged in 2002.

Manatees
A female manatee and her mate were discovered in the harbour in December 1999. The manatee was nicknamed 'Manny', and was believed to have strayed from the Florida coast after a tropical storm or hurricane in 1999. A young boy named Michael Morris documented a swim with the manatee on film.

Its mate was rumoured to have spent many months around Great Harbour, but then became solitary once again leaving the female behind, who is believed to have had a calf sometime in 2000.

In 2012, rescued manatees were brought from Atlantis to the island, where they quickly were accepted by the already present group.

Dolphins
Dolphins are known to swim by the harbour close to shore from time to time.

Transportation
The island is served by Great Harbour Cay Airport.

References

External links
 More Information of Great Harbour Cay

Islands of the Bahamas
Berry Islands